Phrynium macrocephalum is a plant in the family Marantaceae, whose native range is New Guinea.

References

External links
Phrynium macrocephalum GBIF (includes occurrence data)

Marantaceae
macrocephalum
Flora of New Guinea
Plants described in 1889
Taxa named by Karl Moritz Schumann